Montbolo is a commune in the Pyrénées-Orientales department in southern France.

Geography

Localization 
Montbolo is located in the canton of Le Canigou and in the arrondissement of Céret.

Geology 
Montbolo once had gypsum mines, used for making plaster, and also lutite and dolomite. A landslide in a gypsum stone-pit in Montbolo occurred on 20 March 1886 and killed three workers.

Population

Sites of interest 
The Saint-Andrew church of Montbolo was first built in the 12th century and then modified in the 13th, 14th and 17th centuries. At the end of the 19th century, works started for a full repair of the church, but the new roof was entirely destroyed following a storm in January 1900. Other repairs have been made more recently, such as the rebuild of the portal, which destroyed some of the older elements.

Montbolo has two dolmens: the Caixa de Rotllan, on the city limit with Arles-sur-Tech and the dolmen de Formentera.

Culture 
Poetry
 Confidences d'un moutard parisien (1912) is a poem by the writer Marc Anfossi which mentions Montbolo, Palalda and Montalba-d'Amélie.

See also
Communes of the Pyrénées-Orientales department

References

Communes of Pyrénées-Orientales